Andrè Stinka (born 13 June 1965) is a German politician for the left-wing Social Democratic Party of Germany and since 2015 member of the Landtag of North Rhine-Westphalia, the federal diet of North Rhine-Westphalia.

Life and politics 
Stinka was born 1965 in the West German town of Dülmen and became member of the federal diet from 2055 to 2012 and again since 2015.

References 

Living people
1965 births
Social Democratic Party of Germany politicians
People from Dülmen